Lakhdenpokhsky District (Finnish and Karelian: Lahdenpohjan piiri) is an administrative district (raion), one of the fifteen in the Republic of Karelia, Russia. Its administrative center is the town of Lakhdenpokhya. As of the 2010 Census, the total population of the district was 14,235, with the population of Lakhdenpokhya accounting for 54.9% of that number.

Administrative and municipal status
Within the framework of administrative divisions, Lakhdenpokhsky District is one of the fifteen in the Republic of Karelia and has administrative jurisdiction over one town (Lakhdenpokhya) and fifty rural localities. As a municipal division, the district is incorporated as Lakhdenpokhsky Municipal District. The town of Lakhdenpokhya and one rural locality (the station of Yakkima) are incorporated into an urban settlement, while the remaining forty-nine rural localities are incorporated into four rural settlements within the municipal district. The town of Lakhdenpokhya serves as the administrative center of both the administrative and municipal district.

See also
 Ivar Vidfamne, legendary Swedish king said to have been buried in Lakhdenpokhsky

References

Citations

Sources

Districts of the Republic of Karelia